Neolithic site Okolište (or Okolišće) is located in the municipality of Visoko, Bosnia and Herzegovina. It was proclaimed a national monument of Bosnia and Herzegovina. It is the largest Butmir culture site. Excavations have identified at least nine phases in settlement history.

Location 

The Visoko Basin is situated 40 km northwest of Sarajevo. The basin is crossed by the river Bosna and is 400–410 m above sea level. The basin is encircled by Miocene mountains of up to 1000 m height. Within the Visoko Basin, about 15 Middle and Late Neolithic sites are known by surveys and earlier excavations.

Research 
Field work focused on the site of Okolište, in the northern part of the Visoko basin, was carried out during several campaigns from 2002 to 2008. Because of its size of about 7 ha, this settlement represents is categorized as a central place within Visoko basin which has several neolithic sites as those in Donje Moštre and Arnautovići.

Neolithic settlement Okolište is located between the villages of Radinovići and Okolište, about 6 km northwest of Visoko. In the river valleys of Bosna and Neretva there are 36 sites of Butmir culture. In the Sarajevo basin the biggest settlement is in Butmir itself. The biggest settlement in Visoko basin is in Okolište, with an area of 7-5 hectares.

Visoko basin along with neighboring Kakanj was a core region of the Neolithic settlement of Central Bosnia. Area has seen  distinct increase in the number and total area of settlements around 5200 BC or earlier.

The research was carried out in cooperation with the Roman-German Commission of the German Archaeological Institute in Frankfurt and the University of Bamberg and Kiel and the City Museum in Visoko. Geomagnetic prospecting clearly shows a greater number of protective ditches and showed a clearly visible structure of 54 houses. Their length ranges between 12 and 13 m, while the width varies between 6 and 8 m. Detailed measurements within individual houses have identified by a wall, multi-room divisions, and two furnaces in each house, which largely coincides with objects known in Neolithic settlement of Obre II.

During excavations, a total of 7 houses were discovered. Within a few houses, there were remains of stoves, ingle fireplaces, a large number of workshops, ornaments and workshops for making stone tools, and a large number of different pits. Most archaeological material found is ceramics. The ceramic pots with the contents of the ornaments and forms belong to the phase Butmir II and the lower phase of Butmir III (Hvar-Lisičići), that is dated from 4800 and 4700 BCE.

The results of the excavations and the geomagnetic survey allow the estimation of the number of houses and of the population size of Okolište. It is estimated that 200 houses existed at the same time in the earlier phase of the settlement. With the assumption that one household consisted of five individuals the number of inhabitants can be estimated at approximately 1000. Visoko basin could be home to roughly 3500 individuals that lived here which corresponds to a population density of 32 inhabitants per sq. km.

Food production in the Late Neolithic Visoko Basin and its surrounding area was based on a combination of agriculture and animal husbandry while hunting was of less importance. Cattle was of great importance to Neolithic population in Visoko basin. Agriculture in Okolište was based on grain cultivation dominated by emmer and einkorn, along with barley, millet and naked wheat.

Within 1 km is another archaeological site Donje Moštre, which apart from neolithic culture, has Chalcolithic artifacts, from a period of Vučedol culture.

See also 
 Early history of Bosnia and Herzegovina
 Butmir culture
Kakanj culture

References

Further reading 

 Butmir culture
 Excavations in Okolište and the reconstruction of Late Neolithic settlement processes in the Visoko Basin in Central Bosnia (5200–4500 B.C.) 
 The Bosnian Evidence: The New Late Neolithic and Early Copper-Age Chronology and Changing Settlement Patterns
The Socio-Political Development of the Late Neolithic Settlement of Okoliste/Bosnia-Hercegowina: Devolution by Transhumance?
Trypillia Mega-Sites and European Prehistory: 4100-3400 BCE
Eurasia at the Dawn of History: Urbanization and Social Change

External links 
 http://www.jungsteinsite.uni-kiel.de/pdf/2004_kucan.pdf
 http://www.jungsteinsite.uni-kiel.de/pdf/2007_okoliste_low.pdf
 http://www.okoliste.uni-kiel.de/
http://h.etf.unsa.ba/butmir/english/okoliste.html
Excavations in Okolište and the reconstruction of Late Neolithic settlement processes in the Visoko Basin in Central Bosnia (5200–4500 B.C.)  by Robert Hofmann, Zilka Kujundžić-Vejzagić, Johannes Müller, Nils Müller-Scheeßel, Knut Rassmann
New radiocarbon dates for the Neolithic period in Bosnia & Herzegovina
Late Neolithic vegetation around three sites in the Visoko basin, Bosnia, based on archaeo-anthracology – spatial variation versus selective wood use.
History of Visoko
Neolithic sites of Europe
National Monuments of Bosnia and Herzegovina
Butmir culture